A zoom-lens reflex (ZLR) camera is a low-end single-lens reflex (SLR) camera having an integrated zoom lens rather than the interchangeable lenses found on other SLR cameras.

The term was coined by Olympus for the IS-series film cameras.
Olympus also applied the designation to the D-500L & D-600L in press releases carried by PR Newswire. Olympus now refers to these cameras, along with the
D-620L, simply as "Digital cameras".

For the Olympus E-10 and E-20 digital cameras, while some journalists continued to apply the term ZLR, Olympus themselves reverted to using the term SLR.

See also
 Single-lens reflex camera
 Digital single-lens reflex camera
 Electronic viewfinder

References

Cameras by type